Martí Riverola Bataller (born 26 January 1991) is a Spanish professional footballer who plays as a central midfielder for Andorran club Atlètic Club d'Escaldes.

Club career

Barcelona
Born in Barcelona, Catalonia, Riverola joined FC Barcelona's youth academy in 1999 at the age of 8, and started his career as a forward, being reconverted into a midfielder for the 2004–05 season. In spite of this change he retained his goalscoring touch, being the under-19's second-top scorer in 2010 with 13 goals.

In late 2009, still registered with the juniors, Riverola made his debut for Barcelona's B team, in a 2–0 away win against neighbours RCD Espanyol B. They eventually returned to Segunda División after 11 years, but the player only appeared once more in the league.

Riverola joined Eredivisie club Vitesse Arnhem in January 2011 on a six-month-long loan, as the Dutch were managed by countryman Albert Ferrer, himself a former Barcelona player. In July he returned to Barcelona and its reserves, alongside Isaac Cuenca, and scored five goals in 32 games throughout the campaign to help the B's finish eighth.

On 6 December 2011, Riverola made his first and only official appearance for the main squad, coming on as a substitute for Sergi Roberto in the dying minutes of a 4–0 home victory over FC BATE Borisov in the UEFA Champions League.

Bologna
On 7 June 2012, Riverola was presented as a player of Bologna F.C. 1909, having already agreed to a four-year contract in late January; FIFA later ordered the Italian side to pay Barcelona €535,000 as training compensation, although he was a free agent. During his spell at the Stadio Renato Dall'Ara he only appeared in three competitive games, his Serie A input consisting of 50 minutes in a 2–1 loss at A.C. Milan on 20 January 2013.

In August 2013, Riverola was loaned to RCD Mallorca of the Spanish second tier, and he spent the second half of the 2014–15 season with SC Rheindorf Altach of the Austrian Bundesliga, on loan with an option make the move permanent.

Foggia and Reggiana
On 17 July 2015, Riverola was signed by Foggia Calcio on a two-year contract. In January 2017, he joined A.C. Reggiana 1919 also in the Serie C.

Ibiza and Andorra
Riverola returned to his country in August 2018, with third-division UD Ibiza. He joined FC Andorra in the following transfer window, going on to be part of the squad that promoted from the regional leagues to the professional ones in just three years.

On 1 September 2022, Riverola terminated his contract. He remained in the principality nonetheless, signing with Primera Divisió side Atlètic Club d'Escaldes.

Career statistics

Club

References

External links

1991 births
Living people
Spanish footballers
Footballers from Barcelona
Association football midfielders
Segunda División players
Segunda División B players
Primera Federación players
Divisiones Regionales de Fútbol players
FC Barcelona Atlètic players
FC Barcelona players
RCD Mallorca players
UD Ibiza players
FC Andorra players
Eredivisie players
SBV Vitesse players
Serie A players
Serie C players
Bologna F.C. 1909 players
Calcio Foggia 1920 players
A.C. Reggiana 1919 players
Austrian Football Bundesliga players
SC Rheindorf Altach players
Primera Divisió players
Atlètic Club d'Escaldes players
Spanish expatriate footballers
Expatriate footballers in the Netherlands
Expatriate footballers in Italy
Expatriate footballers in Austria
Expatriate footballers in Andorra
Spanish expatriate sportspeople in the Netherlands
Spanish expatriate sportspeople in Italy
Spanish expatriate sportspeople in Austria
Spanish expatriate sportspeople in Andorra